Eric Shade (born 27 August 1943) is an Australian former cricketer. He played five first-class cricket matches for Victoria between 1966 and 1970.

See also
 List of Victoria first-class cricketers

References

External links
 

1943 births
Living people
Australian cricketers
Victoria cricketers
Cricketers from Melbourne